A  is a unit of area used in Argentina and in many Central American countries, originally defined as 10,000 square  in Spanish customary units. In other Spanish-speaking regions, the term has the meaning of a city block.

Today its size varies between countries:
 In Argentina it is a hectare, 10,000 m2.

In calculations, the approximate value of 7000 m2 (or equivalently 0.7 ha) is often used to simplify conversion.

See also
Honduran units of measurement

Footnotes

References

External links
 manzana definition on sizes.com
 

Units of area